The Western Indo-Pacific is a biogeographic region of the Earth's seas, comprising the tropical waters of the eastern and central Indian Ocean. It is part of the larger Indo-Pacific, which includes the tropical Indian Ocean, the western and central Pacific Ocean, and the seas connecting the two in the general area of Indonesia. The Western Indo-Pacific may be classified as a marine realm, one of the great biogeographic divisions of the world's ocean basins, or as a subrealm of the Indo-Pacific.

The Western Indo-Pacific realm covers the western and central portion of the Indian Ocean, including Africa's east coast, the Red Sea, Gulf of Aden, Persian Gulf, Arabian Sea, Bay of Bengal, and Andaman Sea, as well as the coastal waters surrounding Madagascar, the Seychelles, Comoros, Mascarene Islands, Maldives, and Chagos Archipelago.

The transition between the Western Indo-Pacific and Central Indo-Pacific occurs at the Strait of Malacca and in southern Sumatra.

The Western Indo-Pacific does not include the temperate and polar waters of the Indian Ocean, which are part of separate marine realms. The boundary between the Western Indo-Pacific and Temperate Southern Africa marine realms lies in South Africa near the border with Mozambique, where the southernmost mangroves and tropical corals are found.

Subdivisions
The Western Indo-Pacific is further subdivided into marine provinces, and the marine provinces divided into marine ecoregions:

Red Sea and Gulf of Aden

 Northern and Central Red Sea
 Southern Red Sea
 Gulf of Aden

Somali/Arabian

 Persian Gulf
Gulf of Oman
Western Arabian Sea
Central Somali Coast

Western Indian Ocean

Northern Monsoon Current Coast
East African Coral Coast
Seychelles
Cargados Carajos/Tromelin Island
Mascarene Islands
Southeast Madagascar
Western and Northern Madagascar
Bight of Sofala/Swamp Coast
Delagoa

West and South Indian Shelf

 Western India
 South India and Sri Lanka

Central Indian Ocean Islands

 Maldives
 Chagos

Bay of Bengal

 Eastern India
 Northern Bay of Bengal

Andaman

 Andaman and Nicobar Islands
 Andaman Sea Coral Coast
 Northern Sumatran Coast

Eastern Indian Ocean
 Western Sumatran Coast
 Sunda Strait
 Java Sea
 Southern Javan Coast
 Flores Sea
 Savu Sea
 Timor Sea
 Western Australian Coast

References
 Spalding, Mark D., Helen E. Fox, Gerald R. Allen, Nick Davidson et al. "Marine Ecoregions of the World: A Bioregionalization of Coastal and Shelf Areas". Bioscience Vol. 57 No. 7, July/August 2007, pp. 573–583. 

 
Marine realms
Oceans
Indian Ocean
Pacific Ocean